Shocking is an album by the all-girl Japanese rock band Tsu Shi Ma Mi Re.  Their fourth full-length album, it was released in 2012.

Track listing
"Hungry and Empty" - 5:38
"Darwin" - 3:38
"Theme of Sara" - 4:31
"Memoirs of Cabbage Wild" - 5:26
"Hokka Hoka Day" - 4:06
"Fly, Ebi Fried." - 3:26
"Shocking" - 2:02
"Road of Girl" - 3:55
"Hours Carnival" - 4:32
"Messiah ~The God of Food~" - 9:40
"UFO For You" - 4:05
"Space and Big Love" - 7:38

References

Tsu Shi Ma Mi Re albums
2012 albums